Kaunissaare Reservoir is located on Jägala river in Kaunissaare Village, Anija Parish, Harju County, Estonia, near Kehra.

The reservoir is part of the Tallinn water supply system and is connected to Pirita, Soodla and Aavoja rivers via canals.

History 
The construction of the reservoir took place between 1980 and 1984.

A fish passage was built between the reservoir and downstream Jägala river in 2015.

See also 
 Soodla Reservoir
 Raudoja Reservoir
 Aavoja Reservoir
 Paunküla Reservoir
 Vaskjala Reservoir
 Lake Ülemiste
 List of lakes of Estonia

References

Anija Parish
Reservoirs in Estonia
Lakes of Harju County